Albert Greene is the name of:

 Albert C. Greene (1792–1863), US Senator from Rhode Island
 Albert Gorton Greene (1802–1868), American judge and poet

See also
 Bert Greene (disambiguation)
 Albert Green (disambiguation)
 Al Green (disambiguation)
 Alan Green (disambiguation)
 Al Greene (disambiguation)